Pennsylvania held its elections October 11, 1814.

See also 
 Pennsylvania's 2nd congressional district special election, 1814
 Pennsylvania's 3rd congressional district special election, 1814
 Pennsylvania's 1st congressional district special election, 1815
 Pennsylvania's 3rd congressional district special election, 1815
 Pennsylvania's 9th congressional district special election, 1815
 United States House of Representatives elections, 1814 and 1815
 List of United States representatives from Pennsylvania

Notes

References 

1814
Pennsylvania
United States House of Representatives